Shona Pitman is a former Jersey politician who was first elected as a Deputy for St Helier in the Jersey general election of 2005.  She lost her seat in January 2014 after being declared bankrupt.

References

Living people
Deputies of Jersey
Jersey women in politics
21st-century British women politicians
Year of birth missing (living people)